Diaphus dahlgreni is a species of lanternfish found in the Philippines and the Western Central Pacific Ocean.

Etymology
The fish is named in honor of zoologist Ulric Dahlgren (1870–1946), of Princeton University, because of his work on “luminous animals”

References

Myctophidae
Taxa named by Henry Weed Fowler
Fish described in 1934